Indonesia participated in the 1990 Asian Games held in Beijing, China from September 22, 1990 to October 7, 1990. The country was ranked 7th in the medal tally with 3 gold medals, 6 silver medals and 21 bronze medals; a total of 30 medals.

Medal summary

Medal table

Medalists

References

Nations at the 1990 Asian Games
1990
Asian Games